SS Mission Purisima was a Type T2-SE-A2 tanker built for the United States Maritime Commission during World War II. After the war she was acquired by the United States Navy as USS Mission Purisima (AO-118). Later the tanker transferred to the Military Sea Transportation Service as USNS Mission Purisima (T-AO-118).

Service history
Mission Purisma was laid down on 10 June 1943 under a Maritime Commission contract by Marinship Corporation, Sausalito, California; launched 25 August 1943, sponsored by Mrs. John Collins; and delivered 23 November 1943. Chartered to Deconhill Shipping Company for operations, she carried fuel to allied forces in the Pacific and the Atlantic theaters until 27 April 1946 when she was returned to the Maritime Commission and laid up in the Maritime Reserve Fleet at Suisun Bay, California.

Acquired by the Navy on 15 October 1947 she was placed in service with Naval Transportation Service as Mission Purisma (AO-118) and continued serving in the Transportation Service until taken over by the new Military Sea Transportation Service on 1 October 1949 and designated USNS Mission Purisma (T-AO-118). She served with MSTS until 16 May 1955 when she was returned to the Maritime Administration and laid up in the Maritime Reserve Fleet at Olympia, Washington. She was struck from the Naval Vessel Register on the same date.

Reacquired by the Navy on 26 June 1956 she was placed in service with MSTS and served until returned to MARAD on 4 December 1957 and laid up at the Maritime Reserve Fleet at Suisun Bay. Again struck from the Naval Vessel Register that same date, she remained berthed at Suisun Bay into 1969.

The ship was sold for scrapping to American Ship Dismantlers, Inc. on 27 April 1976.

See also
Original Mission La Purísima

Awards
During her active military service she was awarded the National Defense Service Medal, the Korean Service Medal, the United Nations Service Medal and the Republic of Korea War Service Medal (retroactively).

References

 
 

 

Type T2-SE-A2 tankers
Ships built in Sausalito, California
1943 ships
World War II tankers of the United States
Purisima
Type T2-SE-A2 tankers of the United States Navy